{{Infobox royalty
| name         = Lê Cung Hoàng黎恭皇
| full name    = Lê Xuân (黎椿)
| temple name  = 
| posthumous name = Cung Hoàng đế (恭皇帝)
| title        = Emperor of Đại Việt
| image        = 
| caption      = 
| succession   = Emperor of the Lê dynasty
| reign        = 1522–1527
| predecessor  = Lê Chiêu Tông
| successor    = Lê Trang Tông
| house        = Lê dynasty
| father       = Lê Sùng
| mother       = Trịnh Thị Loan
| spouse       = 
| birth_date   = 26 July 1507
| death_date   = 15 June 1527 (aged 19)
| era name     = Thống Nguyên (統元)
| era dates    = 1522–1527
}}Lê Cung Hoàng (黎恭皇, 26 July 1507 – 15 June 1527), born Lê Xuân''', was the last emperor of the Later Lê dynasty of Vietnam. He reigned from 1522 to 1527. Lê Cung Hoàng was put on the throne by the powerful general Mạc Đăng Dung in 1522 in place of the deposed emperor, Lê Chiêu Tông. Eventually Mạc Đăng Dung deposed Lê Cung Hoàng in 1527, thus establishing the Mạc dynasty.

Cung Hoang
Vietnamese monarchs
16th-century Vietnamese monarchs
1507 births
1527 deaths